Symond Lawes  is an English actor, photographer, businessman, and music manager, events producer, best known for his work in several features of the 1980s and 1990s, as well as being an artist manager of Ska bands along with supporting the style and culture of skinheads.

Life and career

A native of the United Kingdom, he began his career modeling at 13 and went onto appear in several features of the 1980s and 1990s, including being an accredited actor in Doctor Who, The Getaway, Dear John and The Drugs Game. He also was a high demand men's fashion model for Merc Clothing.In 2007 he produced X-Ray Spex show live at Camden Roundhouse  In 2011, he began the Great Skinhead Reunion in Brighton, England, and is the owner and administrator of subcultz.com. He played a character called Henry in The One Game released in 2020 on Amazon prime. He is also the manager of Jamaican ska band Pyramids Symarip He currently resides in his native Brighton with his two sons, performs music, and is active with photography. In 2014, he organized a reunion for skinheads on Brighton Beach. In 2016, he appeared in the BBC Four documentary, The Story of Skinhead by Don Letts. His sons, Archie Brewis-Lawes and Jack Brewis-Lawes, have the band called Mindofalion.

Filmography
Meades Eats (TV Series documentary) 
Whose Food? (2003) ... White Van Man 
Fast Food (2003) ... Robber 
2002  The Getaway (Video Game)- Sparky / Pedestrian (voice, as Symmond Lawes also) 
1990  Troublemakers (TV Series)  
Episode #1.4 (1990) ... Spud 
1990  The Bill (TV Series) 
Legacies (1990) ... Carl Benskin 
1988 The Firm
Yeti Gang Member
1988  Doctor Who (TV Series)  
Silver Nemesis: Part Two (1988) ... Skinhead 
1988  The One Game (TV Mini-Series) 
Saturday (1988) ... Punk 3 
Friday (1988) ... Punk 3 
*1987  Dear John (TV Series) 
Kate Returns (1987) ... Wayne
The Growing Pains of Adrian Mole, Barry Kents gang Skinhead (1987)

References

External links
 
 
 Home Page, Lawes own and personally managed website
 Symond Lawes, Lawes blog

1965 births
Living people
20th-century English male actors
21st-century English male actors
English male television actors
English male voice actors
English male film actors
Photographers from Sussex
English male singer-songwriters
English male models
English bloggers
English rock guitarists
21st-century English singers
20th-century English singers
English video game actors
British male bloggers
Musicians from Brighton and Hove
20th-century British male singers
21st-century British male singers